Guo Wei (born 8 July 1989) is a Chinese footballer currently playing as a goalkeeper for Shenzhen.

Club career
Guo Wei would play for the Dalian Shide F.C. youth team and was sent out to their satellite team Dalian Shide Siwu, who played as a foreign team in Singapore's S.League in the 2008 league season before going on loan to second tier club Beijing Baxy&Shengshi at the start of the 2010 China League One season. After returning from his loan period Dalian allowed him to leave for third tier club Chongqing F.C. who in his debut season would establish himself as a regular as the team gained promotion after coming runners-up within the 2011 China League Two league season. The club would remain within the China League One until they were relegated at the end of the 2013 league season and disbanded.

Guo would join third tier football club Dalian Transcendence and by the 2015 China League Two season go on to gain promotion after coming runners-up at the end of the campaign. He would go on to be an integral member of the team as he ensured the club remained within the second tier at the end of the 2016 China League One season. This was followed by a move to another China League One club in Shanghai Shenxin on 6 March 2017. After being an integral member of the Shanghai Shenxin team for two seasons, newly promoted team to the top tier Shenzhen signed Guo on 26 February 2019.

Career statistics

Notes

References

External links

1989 births
Living people
Chinese footballers
Chinese expatriate footballers
Association football goalkeepers
China League Two players
China League One players
Chinese Super League players
Dalian Shide F.C. players
Beijing Sport University F.C. players
Dalian Transcendence F.C. players
Shanghai Shenxin F.C. players
Shenzhen F.C. players
Chinese expatriate sportspeople in Singapore
Expatriate footballers in Singapore